Inverse method may refer to:

 The inverse transform sampling method
 The inverse method in automated reasoning